Rasulpur Union is an Union Parishad under Lohagara Upazila of Narail District in the division of Khulna, Bangladesh. It has an area of 87.28 km2 (33.70 sq mi) and a population of 14,714.

References

Unions of Kalia Upazila
Unions of Narail District
Unions of Khulna Division